The Doğan class is one of the fast attack craft / missile boat classes of the Turkish Navy.

They were fitted with LIOD Mk.2 electro-optical fire control and TACTICOS command control systems during their mid-life modernization program.

TCG Doğan was built in Germany, other ships of the class were built in Turkey.

List of boats

See also
List of Turkish Navy ships

External links
 Official Turkish Navy site
 Turkish Navy Doğan class patrol craft

Missile boat classes
Missile boats of Germany
Missile boats of the Turkish Navy